Saperda populnea, the small poplar borer, is a species of beetle in the family Cerambycidae which forms woody galls on twigs of poplars and willows. It was described by Carl Linnaeus in 1758.

Description
The beetles can be found from May to July, with the female makes a horseshoe shaped cut and laying an egg in the incision. The gall develops in an internode as a symmetrical swelling, which can be 20 mm long, and contains a yellowish larva or pupa in a single elongate chamber. An exit hole is made in the spring. It is most common on apen (Populus tremula) and also found on black cottonwood (P. trichocarpa), black poplar (P. nigra) and goat willow (Salix caprea). 
In Britain the gall is commonest on the young twigs of aspen.

Distribution
Has been recorded in the following countries, Albania, Algeria, Austria, Belarus, Belgium, Bosnia and Herzegovina, Bulgaria, Canada, China, Croatia, Czech Republic (Bohemia, Moravia), France, Germany, Hungary, Italy, Japan, Kazakhstan, Luxembourg, Mongolia, Morocco, Mexico, North Korea, Poland, Romania, Russia, Sardinia, Serbia, Sicily, Slovakia, Slovenia, Spain, Sweden, Norway, Switzerland, Turkey, United Kingdom, United States of America.

References

External links

populnea
Beetles described in 1758
Beetles of Asia
Beetles of Europe
Beetles of North America
Gall-inducing insects
Taxa named by Carl Linnaeus
Willow galls